Seeekret is the seventh and final  album by American New York City based Kleeer.

Track listing
"Take Your Heart Away"   	 6:14   	
"You Got Me Rockin'" 	5:13 	
"Lay Ya Down Ez" 	5:07 	
"Seeekret" 	6:07 	
"Do Not Lie To Me" 	4:57 	
"Never Cry Again" 	4:49 	
"Call My Name" 	4:23

Personnel
 Norman Durham - bass, keyboards, lead and backing vocals
 Woody Cunningham - Percussion, lead and backing vocals
 Paul Crutchfield - Percussion, lead and backing vocals
 Richard Lee - guitar, backing vocals
 Eumir Deodato - synthesizer
 Keith O'Quinn - trombone
 Bob Malach - tenor saxophone
 Barbara Byrd, Christine Holmes - backing vocals

Charts

Singles

References

External links
 Kleeer-Seeekret at Discogs

1985 albums
Kleeer albums
Atlantic Records albums
Albums produced by Eumir Deodato